The Manticore and Other Horrors is the tenth studio album by English extreme metal band Cradle of Filth. It was released on 29 October 2012 in Europe and on 30 October in USA. It is the band's first and only album so far as a three-man group rather than its six-man staple. It was also the last release with Paul Allender on guitar, who departed the band for a second time in April 2014.

Background
Guitarist Paul Allender told Ultimate Guitar that "The last thing we want to do is come out with another album that sounds like the last two. We decided to change direction and go back to what we used to do with the female vocals; all the strong melody lines and harmonies... I've put a lot of punk orientated riffs back into it again. It's really gone quite dark and pretty hardcore."

A press release in August 2012 revealed that the album was conceived as "a bestiary, a collection of stories on monsters," including "personal demons, chimeras, literary fiends, and world-enslaving entities..." The title track, "Manticore", was described as being "about a beautiful mythological horror that comes to be feared as the disfigurehead [sic] of foreign occupation in the Indian provinces". "Illicitus" and "Pallid Reflection" meanwhile, involve "lycanthropy and vampirism"; "For Your Vulgar Delectation" and "Frost on Her Pillow" are "grim fairy tales"; and "The Abhorrent" and "Siding with the Titans" are said to "extol tentacular Lovecraftian values".

"Frost on Her Pillow" was the first video to promote the album, after "For Your Vulgar Delectation" and "Manticore" were uploaded to Peaceville's SoundCloud account.

Reception 

The Manticore and Other Horrors has received a generally favourable response from critics. PopMatters called it "the most vital record released by the band in almost a decade", while Kerrang! wrote "There's nothing here that Cradle of Filth haven't done much better elsewhere."

Track listing

Personnel 
Cradle of Filth
 Dani Filth – vocals
 Paul Allender – guitars
 Martin "Marthus" Škaroupka – drums, orchestration

Guest/session musicians
 Daniel Firth – bass
 Lucy Atkins – vocals
 Choir formed by Jill Fallow, Scarlet Summer, Lucy Atkins, India Price, Janet Granger, Petra Stiles-Swinton, Anita Kilpatrick, Robert L. Friars, Daniel Oxblood, Joseph Kelly, Jasper Conway.
 Choir conducted & arranged by Will Graney.
Additional personnel
 Scott Atkins – mixing, engineering and mastering
 Mark Harwood – additional engineering
 Doug Cook – additional engineering
 Matt Vickerstaff – album art
 Travis Smith, Kewin Miceli - additional images

Charts

References

External links 
 

2012 albums
Cradle of Filth albums
Nuclear Blast albums
Peaceville Records albums